OKS may refer to:

OKS Turkey, the high school entrance examination in Turkey until 2007
OKS Recordings of North America, an experimental music label
Civic Conservative Party (Občianska Konzervatívna Strana), a political party in Slovakia
Stomil Olsztyn (football), a Polish football club 
Original Kassai System, a competitive rule system of horse archery developed in the late 1980s by Lajos Kassai, and used by the World Federation of Equestrian Archery (WFEA)

See also
List of Old King's Scholars, former pupils of The King's School, Canterbury, Kent, England
Soyuz 7K-OKS, a version of the Soyuz spacecraft